Discovery Hill is a mountain in Barnstable County, Massachusetts. Faunces Mountain is located west of Discovery Hill.

References

Mountains of Massachusetts
Mountains of Barnstable County, Massachusetts